Claudio Vargas fullname Claudio David Vargas Villalba (born 15 October 1985) is a Paraguayan footballer, who plays for Luqueño.

Career
He was on loan to Treviso in 2nd half of 2006–07 season, and Luqueño in 2nd half of 2007–08 season. On 8 January 2010, Atlético Tucumán signed the Paraguayan midfielder from Club Olimpia.
In 2011 play for Luqueño and play for 3 de Febrero.
In 2012 play for Luqueño.

External links
 BDFA profile
 Primera División Argentina statistics

1985 births
Living people
Sportspeople from Asunción
Paraguayan footballers
Udinese Calcio players
Treviso F.B.C. 1993 players
Sportivo Luqueño players
Club Olimpia footballers
Atlético Tucumán footballers
Club Atlético 3 de Febrero players
Paraguayan Primera División players
Serie A players
Serie B players
Association football forwards
Expatriate footballers in Argentina
Paraguayan expatriates in Italy
Expatriate footballers in Italy
Atlántida Sport Club players